Fujioka Station is the name of two train stations in Japan:

 Fujioka Station (Tochigi) (藤岡駅)
 Fujioka Station (Shizuoka) (富士岡駅)